The 12221 / 22 Pune-Howrah Duronto Express is a Express train of the Indian Railways connecting Pune Junction (PUNE) to Howrah Junction (HWH). It is currently being operated with 12221 / 12222 train numbers.

It is one of three Duronto's operating out of Pune with the other two being 12263/64 Hazrat Nizamuddin Pune Duronto Express & 12297/98 Pune Ahmedabad Duronto Express.

Coach composition

The rake has 1 AC 1st Class, 3 AC 2 tier, 10 AC 3 tier, 1 Pantry Car and 2 End on Generator coaches.

As with most train services in India, Coach Composition may be amended at the discretion of Indian Railways depending on demand.

Service

It is the fastest train on the Pune – Howrah sector averaging over 5 hours faster than the only other train which does the Pune – Howrah sector 12129/30 Azad Hind Express.

It averages  as 12221 Pune Howrah Duronto Express covering  in 28 hrs 35 mins &  as 12222 Howrah Pune Duronto Express covering the same distance in 27 hrs 25 mins.

Train Details

This train had its inaugural run on 9 October 2010. It is a fully AC train & uses LHB coach.

Loco link
It is hauled by a Bhusaval based WAP 4  or Howrah based WAP-7 from Pune Junction to Howrah Junction.

Time Table

See also
 Duronto Express
 Pune Junction
 Howrah Junction
 Azad Hind Express
 Dedicated Intercity trains of India

External links
http://epaper.timesofindia.com/Default/Scripting/ArticleWin.asp?From=Search&Key=TOIPU/2010/10/10/3/Ar00303.xml&CollName=TOI_PUNE_ARCHIVE_2009&DOCID=239344&Keyword=%28%3Cmany%3E%3Cstem%3EDuronto%29&skin=pastissues2&AppName=2&ViewMode=HTML
http://epaper.timesofindia.com/Default/Scripting/ArticleWin.asp?From=Search&Key=TOIPU/2013/05/06/3/Ar00308.xml&CollName=TOI_PUNE_ARCHIVE_2009&DOCID=609007&Keyword=%28%3Cmany%3E%3Cstem%3EDuronto%29&skin=pastissues2&AppName=2&ViewMode=HTML
http://epaper.timesofindia.com/Default/Scripting/ArticleWin.asp?From=Search&Key=TOIPU/2011/08/15/5/Ar00504.xml&CollName=TOI_PUNE_ARCHIVE_2009&DOCID=367088&Keyword=%28%3Cmany%3E%3Cstem%3EDuronto%29&skin=pastissues2&AppName=2&ViewMode=HTML
http://epaper.timesofindia.com/Default/Scripting/ArticleWin.asp?From=Search&Key=TOIPU/2011/07/03/3/Ar00304.xml&CollName=TOI_PUNE_ARCHIVE_2009&DOCID=350283&Keyword=%28%3Cmany%3E%3Cstem%3EDuronto%29&skin=pastissues2&AppName=2&ViewMode=HTML

Duronto Express trains
Trains from Howrah Junction railway station
Rail transport in Howrah
Transport in Pune
Rail transport in Maharashtra
Rail transport in Chhattisgarh
Rail transport in Jharkhand
Rail transport in West Bengal
Railway services introduced in 2010